Ogies is a settlement in Nkangala District Municipality in the Mpumalanga province of South Africa. It is a coal-mining town 29 km south-west of Witbank and 70 km north-east of Springs.

History
It was laid out in 1928 on the farm Oogiesfontein, 'fountain with many "eyes" or springs'. The name is derived from that of the farm. The town developed around train station built there in 1928. The original name of the town was Oogies but that changed to the current version in 1939.

Economy

Mining
African Exploration Mining and Finance Corporation built its first coal mine at Vlakfontein, near Ogies, which was completed in January 2011. It mostly supplies coal to the nearby Kendal Power Station.

Infrastructure

Transportation
Ogies is an important railway junction on the Springs to Witbank rail-line, a line that connects to the Port of Richards Bay. It has several branches of tracks that service the coal mines close to the town.

Roads
The town is connected by two main roads, the R555 and the R545 to Kriel. The R545 North connects the town to the N12 freeway which links Johannesburg to Witbank.

References

Populated places in the Emalahleni Local Municipality, Mpumalanga
Mining communities in South Africa